The Osmyn and Emily Deuel House, at 271 South 200 East in Centerville, Utah, was listed on the National Register of Historic Places in 1997.

It is a two-story stone house built around 1878, with a one-and-a-half-story rear addition around 1900.  It faces west, and has a north-facing porch.  It was probably built by local masons Charles Duncan and his sons.

It was built for Osmyn Merritt Deuel and his fourth wife Emily Hannah Bowers.

References

National Register of Historic Places in Davis County, Utah
Houses completed in 1878